Revista Católica was a Spanish language Catholic magazine that was published between 1875-1962. The magazine was first based in Las Vegas, New Mexico, and then, in El Paso, Texas.

History and profile
Revista Católica was launched by Donato M. Gasparri, S.J. in 1875. The first issue appeared on 2 January. The goal of the magazine was stated in the first issue to present local, national and international news and to offer religious information. It was published by the Imprenta de Río Grande (Río Grande Press) at a Jesuit college in Las Vegas, New Mexico, on a weekly basis. In 1916 the magazine was moved to El Paso, Texas. There the publisher was Revista Press. From 1955 the frequency of the magazine was switched from weekly to bimonthly. Revista Católica folded in 1962, and the last issue was published on 16 September.

References

1875 establishments in New Mexico Territory
1962 disestablishments in Texas
Bimonthly magazines published in the United States
Catholic magazines published in the United States
Defunct magazines published in the United States
Magazines established in 1875
Magazines disestablished in 1962
Magazines published in New Mexico
Magazines published in Texas
Mass media in El Paso, Texas
Spanish-language magazines
Spanish-language mass media in New Mexico
Spanish-language mass media in Texas
Weekly magazines published in the United States